{{DISPLAYTITLE:C3H4}}
The molecular formula C3H4 (molar mass: 40.06 g/mol, exact mass: 40.0313 u) may refer to:

 Cyclopropene, a cyclic alkene
 Methylacetylene, a common alkyne
 Propadiene, an allene